Syntaxin 3, also known as STX3, is a protein which in humans is encoded by the STX3 gene.

Function 

The protein encoded by this gene is a member of the syntaxin family of cellular receptors for transport vesicles which participate in exocytosis in neutrophils. STX3 has an important role in the growth of neurites and serves as a direct target for omega-6 arachidonic acid.
Mutations in Syntaxin 3 cause Microvillus inclusion disease.

Interactions 

Syntaxin 3 has been shown to interact with SNAP-25, SNAP23 and SNAP29.

References

Further reading